The United VC was a professional women's volleyball team in the Philippine Superliga (PSL). Established in 2017, the club debuted under the sponsorship of United Coconut Planters Life Assurance Corporation (COCOLIFE) and played as the COCOLIFE Asset Managers from the 2017 to 2018 seasons.

The club disbanded in June 2019 due to its inability to find a new sponsor. Prior to the disbandment, key players Alohi Robins-Hardy and Kalei Mau signed up with other PSL teams.

Name changes 
 UVC - Cocolife Asset Managers (2017–2018)
 United Volleyball Club (2019)

Current roster 
For the 2019 PSL Grand Prix Conference:

Head coach
  Joshua Ylaya
Assistant Coach(es)
  Tina Salak
Team manager
  Vian Seranilla
| valign="top" |

Physical Therapist
  B. Solano
Trainer
  Arcalas / Pareja

 Team Captain
 Import
 Draft Pick
 Rookie
 Inactive
 Withdrew
 Suspended
 Free Agent
 Injured

Previous roster

For the 2018 All-Filipino Cup

Head coach
  Moro Branislav
Assistant Coach(es)
  Joshua Ylaya
  JP Pareja
Team manager
   Chris Ponce
| valign="top" |

Physical Therapist
  B. Solano
Trainer
  Tina Salak

 Team Captain
 Import
 Draft Pick
 Rookie
 Inactive
 Suspended
 Free Agent
 Injured

For the 2018 PSL Invitational Cup

Head coach
  Moro Branislav
Assistant Coach(es)
  Joshua Ylaya
  JP Pareja
Team manager
   Chris Ponce
| valign="top" |

Physical Therapist
  B. Solano
Trainer
  Tina Salak

 Team Captain
 Import
 Draft Pick
 Rookie
 Inactive
 Suspended
 Free Agent
 Injured

For the 2018 PSL Grand Prix Conference

Head coach
  Moro Branislav
Assistant Coach(es)
  Emilio Reyes Jr.
Team manager
   Chris Ponce
| valign="top" |

Physical Therapist
  B. Solano

 Team Captain
 Import
 Draft Pick
 Rookie
 Inactive
 Suspended
 Free Agent
 Injured

For the 2017 PSL Grand Prix Conference:

Head coach
  Emilio Reyes Jr.
Assistant Coach(es)
  Dennis Mente
  Joshua Ylaya
Team manager
   Chris Ponce
| valign="top" |

Physical Therapist
  Mike Santos

 Team Captain
 Import
 Draft Pick
 Rookie
 Inactive
 Suspended
 Free Agent
 Injured

For the 2017 PSL Invitational Cup:

For the 2017 PSL All-Filipino Conference:

Head coach
  Emilio Reyes Jr.
Assistant Coach(es)
  Cristina Salak
Team manager
   Chris Ponce
  Joshua Ylaya
| valign="top" |

Physical Therapist
  Mike Santos

 Team Captain
 Import
 Draft Pick
 Rookie
 Inactive
 Suspended
 Free Agent
 Injured

Honors

Team
Philippine Superliga:

Others:

Individual

Team captains
  Michele Gumabao (2017)
  Sara Klisura (2018 Grand Prix)
  Aerieal Patnongon (2018 Invitationals)
  Marge Tejada (2018 All-Filipino)
  Tyler-Marie Kalei Mau (2019 Grand Prix)

Coaches
 Roberto Javier (2017 PSL Invitational Cup)
 Emilio Reyes Jr. (2017)
 Moro Branislav (2018)
 Joshua Ylaya (2019) (interim)

Imports

Transactions

Grand Prix

Additions
 Moro Branislav (Head Coach - from Foton)
 Honey Royse Tubino (from Cignal)
 Sara Klisura (Import - from Foton)

Subtractions
 Michele Gumabao (to PVL–Creamline)

References 

Women's volleyball teams in the Philippines
Philippine Super Liga
2017 establishments in the Philippines
Volleyball clubs established in 2017